Courthouse station is a light rail station in San Diego, California, United States. It is the western terminus of the San Diego Trolley's Orange Line and is located between the Hall of Justice and San Diego Central Courthouse in Downtown San Diego, on C Street between State and Union streets. The station opened on April 29, 2018, after nearly a year of construction.

History

As the San Diego Metropolitan Transit System (MTS) wrapped up its Trolley Renewal Project, the transit agency embarked on a realignment of the trolley lines in Downtown San Diego. With three trolley lines now sharing the tracks in the area, problems quickly popped up. At the beginning of the realignment in September 2012, Orange Line trains terminated at Santa Fe Depot, sharing the same track as the southbound Green Line. In June 2017, the Orange Line terminus was moved to America Plaza, the northern terminus of the Blue Line, forcing complicated switching procedures that often delayed trains on both lines as they entered or exited the station. MTS feared that the extension of the Blue Line to UCSD would only compound issues in the area.

The solution proposed by the MTS was a dedicated western terminus for the Orange Line. The transit agency chose to build the station three blocks east of America Plaza, between the Hall of Justice and San Diego Central Courthouse, which at the time was about to begin construction. Top court officials and San Diego County Sheriff Bill Gore opposed the station, saying that it would jeopardize the safety and security of the courthouse. In response, MTS did make some changes to the station design, including adding a fence to separate the station from a court parking lot and feeding the station's security cameras into the courthouse security system.

MTS received a $31.9 million grant from the state government's cap and trade program in 2015 to fund the Courthouse station project and a vehicle replacement program. Construction on the station began in August 2017, requiring multiple weekend shutdowns of the Orange Line. After nearly a year of construction, Courthouse station was dedicated by local officials on April 27, 2018, and opened to passengers on April 29.

Station layout
Orange Line trains reach Courthouse station using a single siding track and passengers board and alight using a single side platform, while Blue and Silver line trains bypass the station on the two main tracks.

References

Orange Line (San Diego Trolley)
Railway stations in the United States opened in 2018
San Diego Trolley stations in San Diego
2018 establishments in California